Pulicat Lake is the second largest brackish water lagoon in India, (after Chilika Lake), measuring . Major part of the lagoon comes under Tirupati district of Andhra Pradesh. The lagoon is one of the three important wetlands to attract northeast monsoon rain clouds during the October to December season. The lagoon comprises the following regions, which adds up  according to Andhra Pradesh Forest Department:
1) Pulicat Lake (Tamil Nadu-TN & Andhra Pradesh-AP)
2) Marshy/Wetland Land Region (AP)
3) Venadu Reserve Forest (AP)
4) Pernadu Reserve Forest (AP)
The lagoon was cut across in the middle by the Sriharikota Link Road, which divided the water body into lagoon and marshy land. The lagoon encompasses the Pulicat Lake Bird Sanctuary. The barrier island of Sriharikota separates the lagoon from the Bay of Bengal and is home to the Satish Dhawan Space Centre.

History

 In the 1st century, the anonymous mariner who wrote Periplus of the Erythraean Sea listed Podouke (Pulicat) as one of the three ports on the east coast of India. In the 2nd century, Ptolemy's list of ports on this coast included Podouke Emporion.

In the 13th century, Arabs migrated to the shores of the lagoon after they were banished from Mecca for refusing to pay tributes to a new caliph. Streets with dilapidated masonry houses once occupied by these Arabian Muslims are still found in the area and resident families claim records in Arabic testifying the migration.

Portuguese colonized the lagoon in 16th century followed by the Dutch. The Dutch drifted to the lagoon as their ships got stuck on the shores of Karimanal village on the opposite side of the mouth of the lagoon. During the Dutch occupation, Pulicat was known by the name Pallaicatta. Fort Geldria dating to 1609, a church, a cemetery with tombs and mausoleums constructed by the Dutch are protected by the Archaeological Survey of India (ASI). The Dutch transacted business with the British East India Company and other countries in the region.

A scientific study of the palynological characteristics of the lagoon was conducted by taking sedimentary soil samples from four test pits. The radiocarbon dates of peat bed at Kasdreddinilem reveals an age of 4608 plus or minus 122 yrs BP, indicating the shift in mangrove line eastwards during the regressive phase.

Geography and topography

The lagoon's boundary limits range between 13.33° to 13.66° N and 80.23° to 80.25°E, with a dried part of the lagoon extending up to 14.0°N.; with about 96% of the lagoon in Andhra Pradesh and 3% in Tamil Nadu. The lagoon is aligned parallel to the coast line with its western and eastern parts covered with sand ridges. Climate of the lagoon coast line is dominated by tropical monsoons. The large spindle-shaped barrier island named Sriharikota separates the lagoon from the Bay of Bengal. The sandy barrier islands of Irkam and Venad and smaller islands in the north are aligned north–south and divide the lagoon into eastern and western sectors. The morphology of the lagoons is categorized under four types with large areas under mudflats and sandflats. The fishing village of Pulicat is at the south end of the lake. The Satish Dhawan Space Center is located on the north end of the island. Pulicat, Dugarājupatnam and Sullurpeta are villages located on the periphery of the lagoon.

Hydrology
Two rivers which feed the lagoon are the Arani River at the southern tip and the Kalangi River from the northwest, in addition to some smaller streams. The Buckingham Canal, a navigation channel, is part of the lagoon on its western side. The lagoon's water exchange with the Bay of Bengal is through an inlet channel at the north end of Sriharikota and out flow channel of about  width at its southern end, both of which carry flows only during the rainy season. The lagoon acts as buffer to retain the accumulated flood water till the flood water is discharged gradually to the sea during the monsoon period and cyclones. The lagoon and its river basins are located both in Andhra Pradesh and Tamil Nadu states. The lagoon and its drainage river basins become interstate river basin as per Interstate River Water Disputes Act 1956. Most of the lagoon area including its water outlet to the sea is located in Andhra Pradesh.

The water quality of the lagoon varies widely during various seasons – summer, pre–monsoon, monsoon and post–monsoon – as the depth and width of the lagoon mouth varies causing a dynamic situation of mixing and circulation of waters. The resultant salinity variation and DO (dissolved oxygen) affects the primary production, plankton, biodiversity and fisheries in this lagoon. Salinity values vary from zero during the monsoon to about 52,000 ppm (hyper saline) during post and pre–monsoon seasons. Adjustment to this wide variation is difficult for sessile and sedentary species in the lagoon. However, euryhaline species still dwell in the lagoon. The benthic or the bottom habitat of this lagoon is classified into three zones. The southern zone, the first zone, is dominated by sand with some admixture of mud. The second zone at the northern region is wholly muddy. The third zone with sand and mud in equal parts is overgrown with patches of weeds and is reported to be rich in benthic biodiversity. Toxicity levels of heavy metals such as magnesium, lead, zinc, nickel, cadmium, aluminum and copper and chemicals such as ammonia, sulphate and fluoride in the lagoon are well within permissible limits. Recently, the lagoon likely experienced up to 40% desalination due to the impact of freshwater floods from the 2015 South India floods

Flora and fauna
The lagoon has rich flora and fauna diversity, which supports active commercial fisheries and a large and varied bird population.

Limnology
Fishing is the major occupation in the many villages located around the lagoon periphery and on the islands. The lagoon has rich fish diversity, mostly marine species, some truly brackish water and a few freshwater species. Mullets and catfish are the major brackish water fish, which have supported sustenance fishing for the lagoon fishermen. The lagoon is a nursery for several species of fish. Two thirds of the settlements in the lagoon area are in Tamil Nadu and the balance in Andhra Pradesh. 12,370 fishermen live on full-time fishery in the lagoon (6,000 in Andhra Pradesh and 6,370 in Tamil Nadu).

An average 1200 tonnes of fish and crustaceans are harvested annually, of which prawns constitute 60%, followed by mullets. Seafood exports of white and tiger prawns, jellyfish, finfish and live lagoon green crabs are also economic benefits from the lagoon. 168 total fish species are reported. The frequently found ones are the mullets: M. cunnesius, M. jerdoni, M. dussumieri, M. cephalus, M. bornensis and blowfish T. nigropunctatus, T. leopardus, Barbus dorsalis, catfish Macrones vittatus, sardines, Sardinella fimbriata and milk fish. Finfish, green crabs, clams and prawns are the most commercially exploited fishes of the lagoon. Endangered green sea turtles are found on the beaches of Sriharikota beach. Salt is also produced from the lagoon.

Avifauna

The shallow lagoon is known for its diversity of aquatic birds and is an important stopover on migration routes and is reported to be the third most important wetland on the eastern coast of India for migratory shorebirds, particularly during the spring and autumn migration seasons. In view of the rich avifauna of the lagoon, two bird sanctuaries are established in the lagoon, one in each of the two states of Andhra Pradesh and Tamil Nadu. The Andhra Pradesh portion of Pulicat Lake Bird Sanctuary, established in September 1976, has an area of  within the lagoon's total area in the state in the Tada Taluk of Nellore district. The Wildlife Division of the state has listed 115 species of water and land birds in the sanctuary. Nelapattu Bird Sanctuary is also located nearby in its catchment area. The Tamil Nadu part of the lagoon of  area, extending over the Ponneri and Gummidipundi taluks of Thiruvallur district was declared a bird sanctuary in October 1980.

Every year approximately 15,000 greater flamingos are reported to visit the lagoon along with pelicans, kingfishers, herons, painted storks, spoonbills and ducks. The highest concentrations of flamingo are found in the periphery of the lagoon where the water level is below. The concentrations of flamingos are also associated with high algal, fish and benthic diversity. Other water birds in the area include spot-billed pelican, seven species of herons and egrets, painted stork, greater flamingos, ducks,  20 species of shorebirds, gulls, terns, little grebe, Indian cormorant, little cormorant, Asian openbill stork, black-headed ibis, Eurasian spoonbill, lesser whistling teal, Indian spot-billed duck, great thick-knee and stone curlew. Several species of wintering waterfowl have been noted including bar-headed goose, ruddy shelduck, Eurasian wigeon, common teal, northern pintail, garganey, northern shoveller, common pochard, brown-headed gull, black-headed gull, whiskered tern, gull-billed tern and Caspian tern. Birds of prey which appear in winter are the: white-bellied sea eagle, harriers and peregrine falcons. The largest concentrations of flamingos occur in the Andhra Pradesh part of the sanctuary, around the islands of Vendadu and Irukkam.

Aquatic vegetation
There are 59 species of aquatic vegetation, eight of Cyanophyceae, seven Chlorophyceae and two Rhodophyceae. Patches of residual, dry, evergreen forest and large areas of littoral scrub in woodlands in fishing villages bordering the lagoon are seen. Invasive phytoplankton species of Prosopis juliflora, Spirulina major, Oscillatoria spp., Anabaena spp., Rhizosolenia castracanei, Eucampia cornuta and Climacodium frauenfeldianum in the plains on the periphery of the lake have been recorded.

Threats and issues

Due to climate change and delay in the northeast monsoons quite often, lack of dredging activities in the estuaries region like Duggarajapatanam, Mulapadava and Tupilipalem. Diversity of the lake looks like the semi salt desert of what was the Aral Sea. It directly impacts wildlife conversation in those area and livelihoods of the people of the coastal community. Evidence of these changes were inevitable, bird migrations has decreased rapidly due to lack of maintenance of the lake beds. It affects the almost 160 km2 of the lake. Almost 40% of the lake was dried up by 2020. Recent trends and data show that Pullicat Lake is in the verge of destruction due to the lack of dredging activities. If same trends continuous it would be like another Aral Sea.

In the Andhra Pradesh part of the lagoon, several threats to the lagoon have been identified. These are: pollution from sewage, pesticides, agricultural chemicals and industrial effluents from Arani and Kalangi rivers draining into the lagoon bringing fertilizers and pesticides with the runoff from the agricultural field into the drainage basin; domestic sewage; effluents and wastes from numerous fish-processing units; oil spills from the mechanized boats. This activity is also reported to have serious impact on aquaculture development.

Siltation and periodic closure of the bar mouth due to the dynamic process of sediment transport has caused reduction of size and seasonal closure of the mouth of the lagoon. It has reduced fresh sea-water exchange and made the lagoon shallow and turbid. This has caused difficulties such as the bar mouth getting silted up and being closed during the summer season (June–July to Oct–Nov), and an increase in flood levels during the rainy season. The lagoon acts as a large evaporating basin when the bar is closed resulting in salinity levels remaining low or high subject to the flood discharge into the lagoon during the north east monsoon. Fluctuation of water levels in the lagoon (above or below the sea level) is affecting flora, fauna and fisheries; siltation has caused variation of the lagoon mouth resulting in reduction of tidal inflows and consequent decline in stocking of commercially important species of prawns and mullets. The flood plains reclamation in Arani River basin for industrial and residential purposes is also increasing lagoon maximum water level during the floods.

Runoff from agricultural fields in the drainage basins of the Arani and Kalangi rivers into the lagoon has increased pollution load from fertilizers and pesticides; pollution from domestic sewage is also being released to the lagoon. A petrochemical complex, power plant and a satellite port on Ennore creek have further aggravated the problem; there is threat of flooding of 14 island – villages of the lagoon; subsequent to the tsunami in 2004, the number of fishing boats have increased resulting in the "Catch Per Unit Effort" of fish, prawns and crabs declined from 1000 tonnes to about 700 tonnes; and this has increased the social and fishing rights conflicts between marine based fishermen and the lagoon fishermen.

Due to the 2004 Indian Ocean earthquake, lagoon fishery was adversely affected, with many fishing communities losing all means of livelihood until the middle of April 2005, as the loss of lives, homes and boats prevented them from going fishing in the sea and the lagoon. They subsisted on relief supplies provided by the government and other agencies. Many people in fish related trades were also affected. However, a beneficial effect of the tsunami has been the widening of the opening to the lagoon.

Restoration and social activities
Various groups and non governmental organizations are active in the area. The AARDE Foundation maintains Pulicat Museum at Pazhaverkadu to create awareness among inhabitants and city dwellers. AARDE Foundation represented Pulicat at United Nation's World Urban Forum and Habitat III as an associate-partner. Pulicat Day, part of Ramsar's World Wetlands Day, is celebrated every February by AARDE to bring attention to this fragile environment. An expert plan on "Wildlife Action Plan for Conservation Measures on the Pulicat lagoon Sanctuary" has envisaged to set up a hydro biological research station, visitor center, provide shallow-bottomed boats to enable sanctuary staff to patrol the lagoon and to prepare a management plan and conservation strategy for the entire area. COPDANET is striving to implement traditional "Paadu system" and regular desilting to ensure adequate salt and fresh water mix in the lagoon which could enhance fish resources. Centre for Research on New International Economic Order (CReNIEO) has been promoting welfare of fishermen and management of the natural resources of the lagoon. A research study by Loyola College, Chennai reported in 2007 that the lagoon that bore the brunt of industrial pollution has made an ecological turnaround, recording toxicity levels well within permissible limits. Under the Tsunami Emergency Assistance Project (TEAP), construction of a high level bridge across Pulicat lagoon along with approach roads on both sides of the lagoon has been constructed providing a safe escape route for people residing on the islands and also access for emergency response operations.

The southern part of the lagoon in Tamil Nadu  from the estuary is rich in fishes and the fishing is controlled by a traditional Paadu system. Paadu is a traditional system of getting entitlements to eligible members of a particular community for undertaking specified fishing activity in certain designated areas. The fishing grounds fall within a radius of from the mouth of the lagoon with a salinity well maintained without much drying even during low tides. However, this traditional practice is based on caste control of the access rights to the high productive areas and is opposed by eastern fishermen and ocean-side villages. As a result, conflicts leading to violence have been reported.

Transportation
The nearest suburban railway station is at Ponneri. To reach Pulicat on the National Highway 16 from Chennai, drive north toward Nellore, after , turn right towards Ponneri village and continue  to Pulicat village. The Buckingham Canal on the western side of the lagoon is the navigation route through the lagoon used by cargo and passenger vessels.

Gallery

See also
 Nadari river

References

External links 

 Art & Architecture Research Development & Education (AARDE) Foundation

Geography of Tirupati district
Lakes of Andhra Pradesh
Lakes of Tamil Nadu
Coromandel Coast
Wetlands of India
Lagoons of India
Inter-state disputes in India